My Little Cello is an album by bassist/cellist and composer Oscar Pettiford which was recorded in Copenhagen in 1960 and first issued on the Danish Debut label. The album features Pettiford's final studio recordings and was rereleased with additional tracks as Last Recordings by the Late, Great Bassist and Montmartre Blues. The title was also used for a reissue of The New Oscar Pettiford Sextet on Fantasy in 1964 with additional material.

Reception

The AllMusic review by Scott Yanow states: "This is a fine set of boppish music that makes one wonder what Oscar Pettiford might have accomplished in the 1960s had he lived".

Track listing 
All compositions by Oscar Pettiford, except where indicated.
 "Montmartre Blues Out" - 6:45
 "Laverne Walk" - 5:15  
 "Two Little Pearls" - 5:40 
 "Blue Brothers" - 4:00 Additional track on Last Recordings by the Late, Great Bassist  
 "Straight Ahead" (Erik Nordström, Jan Johansson) - 4:35 Omitted on Last Recordings by the Late, Great Bassist   
 "Why Not? That's What!" - 7:20  
 "There Will Never Be Another You" (Harry Warren, Mack Gordon) - 5:48 Additional track on Last Recordings by the Late, Great Bassist  
 "Back in Paradise" (Hans Hammerschmidt) - 4:30 Omitted on Last Recordings by the Late, Great Bassist     
 "My Little Cello" - 3:35  
 "Willow Weep for Me" (Ann Ronell) - 3:00  
 "Montmartre Blues Encore" - 1:00 Omitted on Last Recordings by the Late, Great Bassist

Note
Recorded in Copenhagen, Denmark on August 22, 1959 (tracks 4 & 7), July 5, 1960 (tracks 1-3, 6, 8 & 11) and July 6, 1960 (tracks 5, 9 & 10).

Personnel 
Oscar Pettiford - cello, bass
Allan Botschinsky - trumpet (tracks 1, 2, 5, 6, 9 & 11) 
Erik Nordström - tenor saxophone (tracks 1-3, 4, 5, 7, 8 & 11)
Louis Hjulmand - vibraphone (tracks 1-9 & 10)
Jan Johansson - piano (tracks 1-3 & 5-11)
Jorn Elniff - drums (tracks  1, 2, 5, 6, 8, 9 & 11)

References 

Oscar Pettiford albums
1960 albums
Debut Records albums